The Ann Arbor Area Transportation Authority (AAATA), branded as "TheRide", is the public transit system serving the Ann Arbor and Ypsilanti area in the U.S. state of Michigan. In fiscal year 2021 (October 2020 – October 2021), the system had a ridership of 1,725,797.

History
The AAATA was the first transit authority in the United States to operate low-floor buses when, in early 1993, they took delivery of ten New Flyer D40LF buses. In terms of operation, only two Canadian authorities and the Port Authority of New York and New Jersey operated such buses prior to the AAATA.

In November 2012, the AATA broke ground on the new Blake Transit Center, at a cost of $8.1 million.  The new 2-story, 12,019-square-foot downtown transit hub replaced a one-story structure built at the site at 328 South Fifth Avenue in the 1980s. The new Blake Transit Center was officially opened for use on July 7, 2014.

In August 2013, the agency's board voted to change its name from the Ann Arbor Transportation Authority (AATA) to the Ann Arbor Area Transportation Authority (AAATA). The name change reflects the addition of neighboring Ypsilanti to the agency board and the growing focus on regional services within Washtenaw County's urban core.  In December 2013, the Ann Arbor City Council approved adding Ypsilanti Township as a charter member of the AAATA.

Operations

Fixed routes 
The authority mainly operates fixed-route bus service within its service area. Two transit centers, the Blake Transit Center (BTC) in downtown Ann Arbor and Ypsilanti Transit Center (YTC) in downtown Ypsilanti, serve as the system's main hubs; the system also services a number of park and ride facilities in the area.
Routes that travel between the BTC and YTC (called "Inter-urbans") are numbered in the single digits. Routes that begin at the BTC and serve Ann Arbor neighborhoods (called Local services, or "loops") are numbered 22-34. Similar routes in Ypsilanti that begin at the YTC are numbered 42-47. Routes that connect neighborhoods but do not serve either transit center are numbered 62-68.

Current routes 

3 Huron River
4 Washtenaw
5A/B Packard
6 Ellsworth
22 Pontiac – Dhu Varren
23 Plymouth
24 Eisenhower – Golfside
25 Ann Arbor-Saline Road
26 Scio Church
27 West Stadium – Oak Valley
28 Pauline
29 Liberty
30 Jackson – Dexter
31 Dexter
32 Miller – Maple
33 Newport
34 Maple – Dexter
42 Forest – MacArthur
43 East Michigan Avenue
44 Ecorse – Tyler
45 Grove
46 Huron – Paint Creek
47 Harriet – West Michigan
62 U-M State
63 U-M Pontiac
64 Geddes – East Stadium
65 U-M Downtown – Green
66 Carpenter – Huron Parkway
68 Harris – Ford
98 AirRide (Detroit Metro Airport Shuttle)

TheRide's fixed routes are supplemented by bus services operated by the University of Michigan.

Paratransit and shuttles 
TheRide also operates the ARide paratransit system and ArtFairRide and FootballRide event shuttles. It oversees the iShareARide and VanRide carpooling services. The system also formerly ran a free Link Bus connecting central campus and downtown during the U-M school year until 20 August 2009.

The AAATA is also the designated authority for the proposed Ann Arbor-Howell commuter rail line.

Non-managerial and non-administrative workers at the TheRide are union members, organized in Local 171 of the Transport Workers Union of America.

Fleet 

TheRide currently operates a mix of Gillig Low Floor and Nova Bus LFS buses on its fixed routes. The system's buses run on B12 biodiesel, and many are diesel-electric hybrid units. The AAATA has 55 hybrid electric buses in its fleet and, in 2007, became the first public transit operator in the Midwest to state its intention to convert to all hybrid electric buses, though these plans never came to fruition.

In 2022, the AAATA began exploring a series of plans to replace its entire diesel-powered fleet with battery-electric or hydrogen fuel cell-powered buses by 2035.

Fares

AAATA uses a fixed-fare system. Full fare on fixed-route buses is $1.50, payable by cash or tokens. University of Michigan students, faculty, and staff with a valid yellow Mcard ride for free. Reduced cash fares and discounted passes and tokens are also available, with children under 6, registered seniors 65 years of age and over, and TheRide employees riding for free. 1-day and 30-day unlimited-ride passes are available for $3.00 and $45 respectively.

Transfers are free, and are valid for unlimited connections to fixed-route buses for 90 minutes, including return trips on the same route. They are not valid for event shuttles, or AirRide.

FootballRide and ArtFairRide shuttles have the same $1.50 fare as normal service. Passes and transfers are not accepted, and reduced fares are not available.

The Ann Arbor Area Transportation Authority operates the 98 AirRide line in cooperation with the Michigan Flyer coach service, which runs an express route between downtown Ann Arbor and the McNamara and North terminals of the Detroit Metropolitan Airport in Romulus, Wayne County. Fares are $12.00 for standard adults with reservation, $15.00 per walk-on, and $6.00 for the elderly or disabled. Children under 18 are allowed on free with a paying adult, during round trips.

References

External links
AAATA website
Website for AirRide service to the Detroit airport

Bus transportation in Michigan
Intermodal transportation authorities in Michigan
University and college bus systems
Zero-fare transport services
Transportation in Ann Arbor, Michigan